The 1924 European Figure Skating Championships were held in Davos, Switzerland. Elite senior-level figure skaters from European ISU member nations competed for the title of European Champion in the discipline of men's singles.

Results

Men

References

External links
 results

European Figure Skating Championships, 1924
European Figure Skating Championships
European Figure Skating Championships
Figure skating in Switzerland
Sport in Davos